was an officer and ace fighter pilot in the Imperial Japanese Navy (IJN) during the January 28 Incident, the Second Sino-Japanese War, and the Pacific theater of World War II. As a member of the 12th Air Group during the Second Sino-Japanese War, Mori was officially credited with destroying four Chinese aircraft in aerial combat.

In May 1939, Mori was relegated to reserve status. He was recalled to active duty in July 1942 and participated as a fighter pilot in the Solomon Islands and New Guinea campaigns from air bases at Rabaul and Buin.  Between October 1942 and May 1943, Mori was credited with shooting down five enemy aircraft. In May 1943, Mori returned to Japan and served as a test pilot with the IJN's Naval Air Technology Arsenal until his retirement in August 1944. Mori died of illness in 1960.

References

1908 births
1960 deaths
Japanese naval aviators
Japanese World War II flying aces
Military personnel from Shizuoka Prefecture
Imperial Japanese Navy officers